Nevay Church is a ruined 16th century parish church located near the village of Kirkinch in  Angus, Scotland. Originally dedicated to St Neveth, a church has been recorded at this site since the 14th century. The building and surrounding cemetery are designated a scheduled Ancient Monument. Nevay church was abandoned in 1835 when a newer church was built to serve both the Eassie and Nevay Parishes.

Description

It stands on a raised oval platform and is surrounded by a walled cemetery.

Nevay Church is rectangular in design, measuring  x . Inside the church, adjacent to the north and south walls are several stone artefacts including gravestones and masonry rubble. The church was constructed in coursed rubble of red and grey sandstone. A round-headed arched doorway and small arched window in the west gable may medieval in origin, possibly brought from another location. The south wall contains two doorways now blocked by gravestones. There is a surviving small window set between the two blocked doors.

History
The church of Nevay (dedicated to St Neveth) is on record in the 14th century, and the adjoining burial ground dates to the medieval era.  The present structure was built in the late 16th century. The parish of Nevay joined with the parish of Eassie to become one parish in 1660. The lintel of one of the doorwways is engraved with the date 1695. A gravestone built into the church's walls is dated 1597. Around 1835, a new church named the  Eassie and Nevay Parish Church was built near the village of Nevay. The old Nevay church was abandoned soon after.

The remains of Nevay Church were designated a scheduled monument in 1971 and the surrounding cemetery was added in 2017. The monument consists of the remains of Nevay Church and its burial grounds, excluding the boundary walls.

References

Buildings and structures in Angus, Scotland
History of Angus, Scotland
Scheduled Ancient Monuments in Angus